Wynand Claassen (born 16 January 1951, in Schweizer-Reneke) is a former South African rugby player and Springbok captain.

Playing career
He was selected as eighth-man for Northern Transvaal whilst studying architecture at the University of Pretoria in the late 1970s. He formed a loose-trio with Thys Lourens and Burger Geldenhuys and soon had two Currie Cup final victories, in 1975 and 1977.

In 1980 he moved to Natal and was selected for the Springboks in 1981, captaining the team on his debut against Ireland. Despite Natal's relegation to the Currie Cup B section at the end of 1981 he continued as Springbok captain until 1984. He played seven test matches for the Springboks, all as captain and also played in six tour matches, scoring two tries.

Claassen is credited with reviving rugby at the University of Natal, both as a player and later as a coach. In 1988 he coached the Durban campus of the University of Natal to the Moor Cup title.

Test history

Springbok captain
In 1981 he earned international acclaim as captain during the infamous "Rebel Tour" in New Zealand.

Political influence in South African Rugby
Since retiring from the sport, he has maintained an active role in South African Rugby across the spectrum.  He is often invited to the Captain's Table at various fund raising events.

He has also earned great respect through his active involvement along with other Springbok captains supporting AfriForum's memorandum against political interference and racial discrimination in rugby.

On 12 August 2008, Wynand Claassen and a delegation of former Springbok captains met with the South African Rugby Union as part of their campaign to express concerns and lobby against the use of race to determine team selection.

In this meeting they expressed their intent to send a memorandum to the International Rugby Board.  They assert that racial discrimination in sport and team selection is in conflict with international sporting regulations.

Autobiography
His autobiography, "More Than Just Rugby" was published in 1985.

Social Appearances
Wynand Claassen was an honorary host on the Amabokoboko Blue Train which departed in June 2009 on a rare and distinguished journey from Pretoria. He played host to exclusive guests en route to watch the Springboks vs the British & Irish Lions in their first test match in Durban.

Architect
Claassen is also an architecture graduate and occasional artist. In a Sunday Times interview with Jani Allan he described his passion for architecture: "I'm very interested in old architecture - I think it's a great pity that beautiful buildings that are part of our heritage are torn down to make way for great glass boxes." A self-portrait also accompanied the column.

Personal
His father was George Claassen, a schoolmaster from Middelburg Hoërskool and winner of the 1961 Comrades Marathon between Pietermaritzburg and Durban.

See also
List of South Africa national rugby union players – Springbok no. 519

References

1951 births
Living people
People from Schweizer-Reneke
Afrikaner people
Blue Bulls players
Sharks (Currie Cup) players
South African rugby union players
South Africa international rugby union players
University of Pretoria alumni
South Africa national rugby union team captains
Rugby union number eights
Rugby union players from North West (South African province)